Alice Elizabeth Perkins, CB (born 24 May 1949) is a former British civil servant. She was appointed in July 2011 as the Chairman of Post Office Ltd., a UK state-owned limited company, to lead the Board following the separation of the Post Office from the Royal Mail under the Postal Services Act 2011.

She is an Executive Coach and a partner in the coaching practice of the JCA Group, and has been an external member of the Council of the University of Oxford since 2006. She is a member of the Business Advisory Council of the Saïd Business School of the University of Oxford.

Education
Born in Hampstead, Perkins was educated at North London Collegiate School for Girls, an independent school in northeast London, followed by St Anne's College at the University of Oxford, from which she graduated in Modern History in 1971.

Life and career
Perkins joined the Civil Service in 1971. The early years of her career were spent in the Department of Health and Social Security.  In 1993, she moved to the Treasury as Director of Public Spending, where her priorities were Defence, the Intelligence Agencies, Aid, Foreign Office and Agriculture spending. In 1998, she returned to the 
Department of Health as Director General for Corporate Management responsible for administration of the Department. In 2001, Perkins moved to the Cabinet Office to work as Director General, Corporate Development Group, responsible for human resources across government, top appointments and civil service reform, reporting direct to the Cabinet Secretary. She left the civil service in 2005.

In early 2006, Perkins joined the board of the airports operator BAA plc, until its take-over by the Spanish firm Ferrovial later the same year. She has also served as a non-executive Director on the Board of Littlewoods (1997–2001) and TNS (the global market information company) where she was also Chair of the Renumeration Committee from 2005 until its takeover by WPP in 2008.

Perkins has been married to Jack Straw since 1978. They have two adult children, Will and Charlotte. In 2002, she was made a Companion of the Order of the Bath (CB).

References

1949 births
Living people
Civil servants in the Department of Health and Social Security
Civil servants in HM Treasury
Civil servants in the Ministry of Health (United Kingdom)
Civil servants in the Cabinet Office
People educated at North London Collegiate School
Alumni of St Anne's College, Oxford
Companions of the Order of the Bath
Chairmen of Post Office Limited